Arie is a masculine given name.

Arie or ARIE may also refer to:

Arie, Nagasaki, Japan, a town that was merged with others to form the city of  Minamishimabara
Arie River, Nagasaki Prefecture, Japan
Arie (film), a 2004 Russian film
plural of aria
Mark Arie (1882-1958), American sports shooter and double Olympic champion
Raffaele Arié (1920-1988), Bulgarian operatic bass
 Annual Report on Indian Epigraphy

See also
India Arie (also known as India.Arie), American singer, songwriter, musician and record producer born India Arie Simpson in 1975
Jacob Ben-Arie, Israeli paralympic athlete of the 1960s and 1970s
Shavit Ben-Arie (born 1985), Israeli activist